Galliobatidae is a family of millipedes belonging to the order Julida.

Genera:
 Galliobates Verhoeff, 1911

References

Julida